Pyar Hua Chori Chori is a 1991 Indian Hindi-language film directed by K. Bapayya, starring Mithun Chakraborty, Gautami, Shikha Swaroop, Shafi Inamdar, Shakti Kapoor and Anupam Kher. This was Gautami's debut film in Hindi. It is a remake of the Malayalam film Chithram.

Plot 
Vijay is looking for quick money for his son's operation. He is offered the "job" to act as a husband for a rich, wealthy girl Radha due to circumstances. The make-believe marriage finally ends up in love with each other. But Vijay has a dark past, which would hurt every one. Can he manage to survive?

Cast 
 Mithun Chakraborty as Vijay Kumar
 Gautami as Radha
 Anupam Kher as Jhunjhunwala
 Shikha Swaroop as Vaishali Verma
 Satish Kaul as Jailor
 Shafi Inamdar as Vikram Singh / Raja Sahib
 Shakti Kapoor as Bishambhar
 Yunus Parvez as Shakura
 Viju Khote as Constable Verma
 Mehmood Jr. as Ramkishan
 Shubha Khote as Subhadra

Songs 
"Pyar Hua Chori Chori" – Alka Yagnik, Amit Kumar
"Ja Re Ja O Besharam Chanda" – Kavita Krishnamurthy, Amit Kumar
"Aayi Bahar Phool Khilati" – Suresh Wadkar, Jayshree Shriram
"Aayo Re Aayo Nandlal" – Hariharan, Suresh Wadkar
"Teri Khamoshi Zuban Ban Gayi" – Amit Kumar

References

External links 
 

1990s Hindi-language films
1991 films
1991 romantic comedy films
Films directed by K. Bapayya
Films scored by Laxmikant–Pyarelal
Hindi remakes of Malayalam films
Indian romantic comedy films